Park Café was a band active in Luxembourg between 1986 and 1993. The band represented Luxembourg in the Eurovision Song Contest 1989 with the song Monsieur, which came 20th with a score of eight points.

Members 
 Rom Heck
 Maggie Parke
 Gast Waltzing
 Jean-Jacques Wathgen
 Al Lenners

Discography

Albums 
 Park Café (1987)
 Monsieur (1989)

References 

Luxembourgian musical groups
Eurovision Song Contest entrants for Luxembourg
Eurovision Song Contest entrants of 1989